Curtis Williamson  (January2, 1867 April18, 1944) known for his portraits and figure painting; also genre and landscape. He was nicknamed "the Canadian Rembrandt" because of his dark, tonal style. Williamson showed his work at the Canadian Art Club's inaugural exhibition in 1907 and like some of the other members, his work had a Hague school or Barbizon sensibility.

Career
Williamson was born in Brampton, Ontario. He studied in Toronto, and Paris where he began exhibiting in the Paris Salon in 1891, then in Holland. He brought back a style that was low in tone back with him from Holland when he returned to Toronto in 1892. In 1893, he was elected to the Ontario Society of Artists and exhibited there extensively (1893-1922). He returned to Europe in 1895 and painted in rural Holland, then travelled to France and painted with James Wilson Morrice at Fontainebeau. He also painted at Barbizon. In 1904, he returned to Toronto won a silver medal for his painting Klaasje (1902) at the Canadian exhibition at the Louisiana Purchase Exposition in St. Louis, Missouri. In 1906, he travelled to Newfoundland and painted fishing villages.

In 1907, with Edmund Morris, he helped found the Canadian Art Club, and served as its secretary (1908-1909) and then, as a member of its executive council (1910-1915). He was elected to the Royal Canadian Academy in 1907 and exhibited there from 1894 to 1930. In 1908, the understated manner he used in his paintings as in Fish Sheds, Newfoundland, was seen as startling. He was a founding member of the Arts and Letters Club of Toronto with Lawren Harris and in 1913, Harris praised his work, calling it full of “half-subdued fire” in the Yearbook of Canadian Art. In 1914, he established a studio in the Studio Building. Later, his painting style was freer and less subdued.

Among his portraits, he painted Portrait of Dr J. M. MacCallum ('A Cynic') (1917), Sir Frederick Banting, (1924), and G. Blair Laing (1936-1937). He died in Toronto at age 77.

References

Bibliography 

1867 births
1944 deaths
19th-century Canadian painters
Canadian male painters
20th-century Canadian painters
Canadian landscape painters
Artists from Ontario
Académie Julian alumni
Members of the Royal Canadian Academy of Arts
19th-century Canadian male artists
20th-century Canadian male artists